Hélène de Cressac Martini (6 August 1924 – 5 August 2017) was a Polish-born French striptease artist turned businesswoman and nightclub owner associated with the Folies Bergère, and nicknamed "The Countess" and "The Empress of the Night".

The Polish-born (present-day Belarus) Martini landed in Paris aged 20 after surviving the Holocaust. She was believed to be the sole surviving member of her family. Starting out at the Folies Bergere, she won three million francs on the lottery. She then went on to employ her managerial and entrepreneurial skills to run half a dozen Paris nightclubs, first with her Syria-born husband, Nachat Martini, a lawyer, professor and secret agent (1910–1961), whom she married in 1955. After his death in early 1961, she carried on alone. The couple had no children. She died in 2017, on the day before her 93rd birthday, leaving no known living relatives.

References

1924 births
2017 deaths
Holocaust survivors
Polish female erotic dancers
French female erotic dancers
French businesspeople
Place of birth missing
Polish emigrants to France